Zámolyi Channel originates on the Mosoni Plain, Little Hungarian Plain, in the county of Györ-Moson-Soprn, Hungary. It flows southwestward to Győrzámoly, where it joins the Mosoni-Duna.

Settlements at the banks 
 Győrzámoly
 Győrladamér

References 

Rivers of Hungary
Geography of Győr-Moson-Sopron County